The Aviation Museum Hannover-Laatzen is a permanent exhibition in Laatzen of the history of aviation. 38 airplanes, 800 aircraft models, and more than 30 aircraft engines are displayed on .

Among the vast array of exhibits one can find an original Jumo 004A, one of the first jet engines in history, as well as a Focke-Wulf Fw 190, a Messerschmitt Bf 109 and a Supermarine Spitfire. Aircraft from the postwar era include a MiG-15, an F-104 and an An-2.

History 
The entrepreneur Günter Leonhardt was already interested in gliding as a teenager and volunteered for the Luftwaffe. After the Second World War, Leonhardt created the Nelke shipping company, together with the businessman Karl Nelke. His passion was aviation, and he built a large private collection. For this he rescued several Ju-52 from a Norwegian lake in the Arctic Circle, which had sunk there in 1940. In 1992, he partially transferred his collection to the Aviation Museum Laatzen-Hannover, located on the premises of the company he by then owned. The company Nelke was sold in 1994.

On 11 April 2013, the Aviation Museum Laatzen-Hannover, the Aeronauticum in Nordholz, the Helicopter Museum Bückeburg and the Ju-52 Museum in Wunstorf have joined together to form the "Association of Aviation Museums of Lower Saxony" ("Arbeitsgemeinschaft Niedersächsischer Luftfahrtmuseen").

Exhibits 
Exhibits include civilian and military aircraft. In addition to the aircraft collection are numerous items of everyday use, such as vehicles and clothing. Further emphasis is set on: the early days of aviation, daring pilots, the salvage of the Ju 52 in the Arctic Circle, the history of gliding and women in aviation. Exhibits are mostly arranged in chronological order, starting with the birth of aviation and ending with modern civil aviation.

Airplanes 

 Antonov An-2
 Dornier Do 28 D-2
 Filter Schwan I
 Focke-Wulf Fw 44 Stieglitz
 Focke-Wulf Fw 190 A-8
 Fokker Dr.I, replica
 Fokker E.III, replica
 Grade Eindecker, replica
 HFB 320 Hansa Jet
 Horväth III, replica
 Ikarus Windspiel 2
 Junkers F 13 a, replica
 Klemm L 25 D
 Lilienthal Normalsegelapparat, replica
 Lockheed F-104 Starfighter
 Messerschmitt Bf 109 G-2
 Mikoyan-Gurevich MiG-15
 Mikoyan-Gurevich MiG-21 (as Signpost)
 Nieuport 17, replica
 Piaggio P.149 D
 Rheinflug RW-3b
 Rieseler R III/22, replica
 Ryan M-2 NYP Spirit of St. Louis, replica
 Scheibe L-Spatz 55
 Schneider Grunau Baby II
 DFS SG 38 Schulgleiter Two seater glider
 Sopwith Camel, replica
 Stampe SV-4c
 Supermarine Spitfire Mk.XIV
 Tipsy Nipper
 Ultralight-Aircraft A. K. Meyer FFB I Flamingo
 Yakovlev Yak-18

Helicopters 

 Aérospatiale Alouette II

Other 

 Equipment for pilots
 Junkers Ju 52/3m fuselage
 Flugmotoren und Triebwerke
 WWII Anti-Aircraft Gun
 Instrument Panels and Equipment
 Various aircraft models

Gallery of museum exhibits

See also
List of aerospace museums

References

External links 

  
Luftfahrt-Museum Laatzen-Hannover bei hannover.de

Aerospace museums in Germany
Museums in Lower Saxony